Mwansanga, also known as Mwasanga, is an administrative ward in the Mbeya Urban district of the Mbeya Region of Tanzania. In 2016 the Tanzania National Bureau of Statistics report there were 1,042 people in the ward, from 945 in 2012.

Neighborhoods 
The ward has 2 neighborhoods; Nduguya, and Isoso.

References 

Wards of Mbeya Region